The 1945–46 Irish Cup was the 66th edition of the premier knock-out cup competition in Northern Irish football. 

Linfield won the tournament for the 23rd time and the 2nd consecutive year, defeating Distillery 3–0 in the final at Celtic Park.

Results

First round

|}

Quarter-finals

|}

Semi-finals

|}

Replay

|}

Final

References

External links
 Northern Ireland Cup Finals. Rec.Sport.Soccer Statistics Foundation (RSSSF)

Irish Cup seasons
1945–46 domestic association football cups
1945–46 in Northern Ireland association football